Dušan Milo (born March 5, 1973) is a Slovak professional ice hockey defenceman. He is currently playing for HK Nitra in the Slovak Extraliga (SVK).

Career statistics

Regular season and playoffs

International
He played 90 matches in the Slovak national team, scored 15 goals. He holds a gold medal from the 2002 World Championships and a bronze medal from the 2003 World Championships. He also represented at the 2006 World Championships and the 2002 Olympic Games in Salt Lake City.

WC 2002

His first world championships were the World Cup in Sweden, when he was a member of the team coach Ján Floc. He played in the third defensive pair with Martin Štrbák. [3] He scored the only goal of Slovakia in the match against Finland in the basic group (1: 2). He scored the winning goal in the superstructure against the home team Sweden (2: 1). He also scored in the group's match against Russia (6: 4). Slovakia won over Russia in the final 4: 3 and became the world champion.

WC 2006

Coach František Hossa nominated him for the Latvian Riga World Championship. In the match against Switzerland, he scored the second goal of Slovakia (2: 2). He also scored in the match against Ukraine in the last match of the superstructure part (9: 0). He scored his team's only goal in the quarterfinals against Canada (1: 4).

References

External links

1973 births
Living people
Krefeld Pinguine players
Slovak ice hockey defencemen
Sportspeople from Nitra
Ice hockey players at the 2002 Winter Olympics
Olympic ice hockey players of Slovakia
Slovak expatriate ice hockey players in Germany
Slovak expatriate ice hockey players in Sweden
Slovak expatriate ice hockey players in Switzerland